Croatia–Norway relations are foreign relations between Croatia and Norway. Both countries established diplomatic relations on February 20, 1992.  Croatia has an embassy in Oslo.  Norway has an embassy in Zagreb and an honorary consulate in Rijeka.

Both countries are full members of the Council of Europe and NATO.

History

Norway was active in international peace efforts during the period of the Croatian War of Independence and in the immediate aftermath of it, particularly in multicultural eastern Croatian Podunavlje region. Thorvald Stoltenberg was appointed UN special representative to Croatia in May 1993. Stoltenberg was the United Nations witness at the signing of the Erdut Agreement in 1995 which led to the establishment of the UNTAES administration. In 1998 Norwegian representative Halvor Hartz was the Police Commissioner of the United Nations Civilian Police Support Group in eastern Croatia. In 1999 Olav Akselsen was the Council of Europe Rapporteur on return of refugees and displaced persons to their homes in Croatia. In 2013, related to promotion of inter-ethnic harmony in eastern Slavonia, Norwegian permanent mission to United Nations in Geneva expressed some concerned about the implementation of minority rights, particularly in the case of Serbs and Roma. In 2014 the two countries signed an international agreement on financial assistance (with the minor contribution of Liechtenstein and Iceland) for the establishment of the so-called Integrated School in Vukovar. The project however ultimately failed due to lack of interest to enroll students in the new school by the two largest communities in the town.

Transportation

Croatia Airlines operates a seasonal flight from Zagreb to Oslo (Gardermoen).

Norwegian operates seasonal flights from Oslo (Gardermoen) to Dubrovnik, Pula, Split and Zadar.

Scandinavian Airlines operates seasonal flights from Oslo (Gardermoen) to Dubrovnik and Pula.

See also 
 Foreign relations of Croatia
 Foreign relations of Norway
 Norway–Yugoslavia relations

References

External links 
  Croatian Ministry of Foreign Affairs and European Integration: list of bilateral treaties with Norway
  Norwegian embassy in Zagreb

 
Norway
Bilateral relations of Norway